Trost & Trost Architects & Engineers, often known as Trost & Trost, was an architectural firm based in El Paso, Texas. The firm's chief designer was Henry Charles Trost, who was born in Toledo, Ohio, in 1860.  Trost moved from Chicago to Tucson, Arizona in 1899 and to El Paso in 1903. He partnered with Robert Rust to form Trost & Rust. Rust died in 1905 and later that year Trost formed the firm of Trost & Trost with his twin brother Gustavus Adolphus Trost, also an architect, who had joined the firm as a structural engineer. Between 1903 and Henry Trost's death on September 19, 1933, the firm designed hundreds of buildings in the El Paso area and in other Southwestern cities, including Albuquerque, Phoenix, Tucson, and San Angelo.

Throughout his career, Henry Trost demonstrated his ability to work in a variety of styles, including Art Deco, Mission Revival, Prairie, Pueblo Revival, and Bhutanese Dzong architecture, at the University of Texas at El Paso. Many of the buildings designed by Trost & Trost display an influence from the Chicago School of architecture. Henry Trost had lived in Chicago between 1888 and 1896. In 1889, Henry started the American Art Metal Work Company with Emil Henry Seeman, which lasted about a year.

From 1892 to 1896, Trost served as vice president of Chicago Ornamental Iron Company. The company is associated with metal ornament that formed the front railings of the boxes and balconies in the Lafayette Square Opera House in Washington, DC.

Selected buildings

Steinfeld Mansion (Tucson's First Owls Club), 1898 Tucson, Arizona; Henry C. Trost
South Hall, 1898, University of Arizona, Tucson, Arizona; Henry C. Trost (demolished 1958)
Schneider-Healy House, 1900–1902, Tucson, Arizona; Henry Trost        
Gardiner / Ramsey House 1900–1901, 144 E. University Blvd. Tucson, Arizona Trost & Trost
Tucson's Second Owls Club, 1902-1903 Tucson, Arizona; Trost & Rust
Carnegie Free Library in Tucson, 1900-1901 Arizona; Trost & Trost
Willard Hotel (Pueblo Hotel and Apartments), 1902–1904, 145 S.6th Ave. Tucson, Arizona; Henry C. Trost
Santa Rita Hotel, 1904, Tucson, Arizona Trost & Rust (demolished 1972)  
Ronstadt House, 1904, 607 North Sixth Avenue in Tucson, Arizona; Trost & Rust
Bayless House, 1905, 145 East University Boulevard Tucson, Arizona; Trost & Rust
Tucson Residence (721 E. University Blvd.), 1905, Tucson, Arizona; Henry C. Trost
William Ward Turney residence (now the International Museum of Art), 1908,  El Paso, Texas
Young Men's Christian Association, 1906–1908; El Paso, Texas, Henry C. Trost (demolished in 1961)
Manning House 1907 for Levi Manning at 450 W. Paseo Redondo in Tucson designed by Henry Trost

Henry C. Trost residence, 1908, 1013 W. Yandell Dr. El Paso, Texas ; Henry C. Trost

Walter Douglas House, 1908, Bisbee, Arizona; Trost & Trost
Goodrich House, 1908, Tucson, Arizona; Henry C. Trost
El Paso Country Club, 1908–1909, El Paso, Texas, Henry C. Trost (destroyed by fire in 1916)
Caples Building, 1909, El Paso, Texas. Empty in 2015.
New Mexico State University campus, 1909, Las Cruces, New Mexico
Abdou Building, 1910, at 115 North Mesa Street at Texas Avenue in  El Paso, Texas

Anson Mills Building, 1911, El Paso, Texas
Kerr Mercantile Building, 1927, Sanderson, Texas; Henry C. Trost
Hotel Paso del Norte, 1912, El Paso, Texas; Henry C. Trost
Popular Department Store (now 1 Union Fashion Center), 1912, El Paso, Texas
White House Department Store (now The Centre), 1912, El Paso, Texas
El Paso and Southwestern Railroad Depot 1912 Tucson, Arizona
El Paso High School, 1913–1916, El Paso, Texas; Henry C. Trost
Scottish Rite Cathedral, 1915; Tucson, Arizona; Trost & Trost
El Paso Country Court House, 1915–1916, El Paso, Texas; Henry C. Trost (demolished in 1988)
Arizona Eastern & Southern Pacific Railway Passenger Station, Globe, Arizona, 1916
Occidental Life Building, 1917, Albuquerque, New Mexico
Old Main Building at the University of Texas at El Paso, 1917, El Paso, Texas; Henry C. Trost
Quinn Hall at the University of Texas at El Paso, 1917, El Paso, Texas; Henry C. Trost
Graham Hall at the University of Texas at El Paso, 1917, El Paso, Texas; Henry C. Trost
Geology Building at the University of Texas at El Paso, 1917
Rosenwald Building, 1920, downtown Albuquerque, New Mexico
Kelly Hall at the University of Texas at El Paso- Kelly Hall, 1920–1921, El Paso, Texas; Henry C. Trost
First National Bank Building, 1922, Albuquerque, New Mexico
Houston High School, 1922, El Paso, Texas; Henry C. Trost
State National Building, 1922, El Paso, Texas; Henry C. Trost
Hotel Cortez - Hotel Orndorff, 1922, El Paso, Texas; Henry C. Trost
Loretto Academy, 1922–1936, El Paso, Texas; Gustavus A. Trost

Luhrs Building, 1924, Phoenix, Arizona; Henry C. Trost
Sunshine Building 1924 in Downtown Albuquerque, New Mexico
El Paso Community College, 1925, El Paso, Texas; Henry C. Trost
Hassayampa Inn, 1927, Prescott, Arizona; Trost & Trost
Gage Hotel, 1927, Marathon, Texas
The Holland Hotel, 1928, Alpine, Texas

San Angelo City Hall & Auditorium, 1929, San Angelo, Texas
Gadsden Hotel, 1929, Douglas, Arizona
Luhrs Tower, 1929, Phoenix, Arizona; Henry C. Trost
Hotel Paisano, 1930, Marfa, Texas - Built by Charles Bassett: Gateway hotel chain
Plaza Hotel - Plaza Motor Hotel, New Sheldon Hotel, Hilton Hotel amongst other names, 1929, El Paso, Texas; Henry C. Trost
O. T. Bassett Tower, 1930, El Paso, Texas; Henry C. Trost
Driskill Hotel, 1930 tower addition, Austin, Texas; Henry C. Trost
University of Texas at El Paso- Worrell Hall, 1935–1937, El Paso, Texas; Gustavus A. Trost
University of Texas at El Paso- Benedict, 1935–1937, El Paso, Texas; Gustavus A. Trost
El Paso Country Club repairs (proposed 1920–1922), 1936, El Paso, Texas; Gustavus A. Trost
University of Texas at El Paso- Holliday Hall, 1933, El Paso, Texas; Gustavus A. Trost

References and notes

 Edgell, G.H., The American Architecture of Today Charles Scribner's Sons, New York. 1929
 Guide to the Architecture of Phoenix, Central Chapter of the American Institute of Architects. 1983
 Information gathered by Lloyd C. & June F. Engelbrecht under a grant from the National Endowment for the humanities for the El Paso Public Library, 1990.
 The Spirit of H.H. Richardson of the Midwest Prairies, ed. by Larson and Brown, University Art Museum, University of Minnesota, Iowa Stare University Press, Ames, IA, 1988
 A Photographic History of the University of Arizona 1885-1985 Phyllis Ball. Privately Printed. 1986

External links

 Henry C. Trost Historical Organization
 EPCC Borderlands article: "Henry Trost's Architectural Legacy Lives On"
 Flickr.com: Images of Trost & Trost works
 Inventory of Trost & Trost Architectural Drawings 1916-1931

 
Defunct architecture firms based in Texas
Companies based in El Paso, Texas
 
 
 
Chicago school architects